Igor Mikhailovich Kalashnikov (born 22 January 1993) is a Russian sprint canoeist.

He won a medal at the 2019 ICF Canoe Sprint World Championships.

References

1993 births
Living people
ICF Canoe Sprint World Championships medalists in kayak
Russian male canoeists
Canoeists at the 2010 Summer Youth Olympics